Peter Bennetts Truscott (born 14 August 1941) is a former New Zealand cricketer who played one Test against Pakistan in 1965.

Cricket career
Truscott was a right-handed batsman who had a brief first-class career, lasting just five years. He played three matches for Canterbury without great success in 1961–62, and in the next two seasons played only for the New Zealand Under-23 side in one match each season. In 1963–64, he scored 165 when opening the batting for the Under-23s against Auckland, and this remained his only first-class century.

Described during his career as "one of the most elegant and forceful stroke-makers in New Zealand cricket", Truscott played regularly in 1964–65 and 1965–66 for Wellington. In February 1965 he scored 45 and 50 at number three against Otago, taking part in second-wicket partnerships of 84 and 98 with Bruce Murray, and he was selected for the Third Test against Pakistan at Christchurch that followed a few days later. Opening the batting, he scored 3 and 26, but was not picked for the New Zealand team to tour India, Pakistan and England in 1965. He played for a New Zealand Cricket Council President's XI against the touring MCC in 1965–66, but played no more first-class cricket after the end of the season.

Later life
In October 1966, Truscott and his family moved to Perth, Western Australia, where he had been transferred in his work as a bank accountant. Later he returned to New Zealand and ran a hotel in Nelson, then a motel in Whangārei, and also worked in the real estate business. He is retired and lives with his wife Sue in Orewa, a suburb of Auckland.

See also
 One-Test wonder

References

External links
 

1941 births
Living people
New Zealand cricketers
New Zealand Test cricketers
Canterbury cricketers
Wellington cricketers
Southland cricketers
People from Pahiatua